High Street Historic District may refer to:

in the United States
 High Street Historic District (Hartford, Connecticut), listed on the NRHP in Connecticut
 High Street Historic District (Ipswich, Massachusetts), listed on the NRHP in Massachusetts
 High Street Historic District (Wilmington, Massachusetts), listed on the NRHP in Massachusetts
 High Street Historic District (Camden, Maine), listed on the NRHP in Maine
 High Street Historic District (Burlington, New Jersey), listed on the NRHP in New Jersey
 High Street Historic District (Pottstown, Pennsylvania), listed on the NRHP in Pennsylvania